Podothrombium manolatesicus is a species of mite belonging to the Trombidiidae family, first derived from Greece.

References

Further reading
Saboori, Alireza, VLADIMIR PEŠIĆ, and MILOJE ŠUNDIĆ. "First record of Podothrombium (Acari: Podothrombiidae) from Serbia with description of a new species based on larvae." Systematic and Applied Acarology 30.1 (2015): 121-128.
KAMRAN, MUHAMMAD. Systematics of larval Erythraeidae (Acarina) of Punjab, Pakistan. Diss. DEPARTMENT OF AGRI. ENTOMOLGY FACULTY OF AGRICULTURE, UNIVERSITY OF AGRICULTURE, FAISALABAD, 2009.

Trombidiformes
Arachnids of Europe